El Fantasma de Elena (Elena's Ghost) is a Spanish-language telenovela produced by the American television network Telemundo. It is a remake of the 1983 Venezuelan telenovela Julia.  The telenovela ran for 117 episodes from July 20, 2010 to January 7, 2011.  It was broadcast with English translation subtitles in CC3.

It stars Elizabeth Gutiérrez and Segundo Cernadas as protagonists and Ana Layevska as the main antagonist in a double role (Elena and Daniela).

Plot
Elena Lafé (Elizabeth Gutiérrez) is a young, beautiful, and talented horse rider.  She and her widowed father, Tomás (Braulio Castillo), manage a small but excellent hotel on the Key West ocean shore.  Raised in her father’s shadow and kept away from the maternal side of her family, Elena has never known true love.  That is until she finds Eduardo Girón (Segundo Cernadas), a widower, unconscious in the middle of the forest.  She takes him to her father's hotel and falls hopelessly in love with Eduardo as she nurses him back to health.

The rich, young businessman reciprocates her love and they marry in an impromptu ceremony on the beach.  Elena Lafé and her best friend Laura (Wanda D'Isidoro) move into Eduardo’s mansion, where he lives with several family members and household staff.  The new bride is not given the warmest of welcomes by Eduardo's relatives.  Her unease turns to terror when she keeps hearing screams and moans from the mansion’s tower.

Elena Lafé sees a photograph of Eduardo’s deceased wife, also named Elena.  Elena Lafé learns from Corina (Maritza Bustamante) about the relationship Eduardo had with Elena Calcaño (Ana Layevska), who committed suicide.  Elena Calcaño had a twin sister, Daniela (also played by Ana Layevska), who went mad after Elena Calcaño's death.  Elena Lafé also discovers that her husband and his brothers belong to a mythical race that hides many secrets and conspiracies.

Elena Lafé will have to confront a vengeful ghost, a spellcasting witch, Eduardo’s strange half brother, a deranged twin sister bent on killing her, and hundreds of secrets that will change her life forever.  The twists and turns of the oceanfront locale mirror a storyline intertwined with secret loves, unusual characters, and a mysterious aura.  A web of mystery and chance is spun until we discover the secret behind Elena’s Ghost.

Cast

Main

Recurring

United States broadcast 
 Release dates, episode name & length, and U.S. viewers based on Telemundo's broadcast.

References

2010 telenovelas
2011 telenovelas
2010 American television series debuts
2011 American television series endings
American television series based on telenovelas
Spanish-language American telenovelas
Telemundo telenovelas
American television series based on Venezuelan television series